Comisarovca Nouă (Nova Komisarivka , Novokomissarovka) is a commune in the Dubăsari District of Transnistria, Moldova. It is composed of four villages: Bosca (Боска), Comisarovca Nouă, Coșnița Nouă (Нова Кошниця, Новая Кошница) and Pohrebea Nouă (Нове Погреб'я, Новoe Погребье). It has since 1990 been administered as a part of the breakaway Pridnestrovian Moldavian Republic (PMR).

References

Communes of Transnistria
Dubăsari District, Transnistria